Phyo is a Burmese name that may refer to the following notable people:
Pyae Phyo Paing (born 1992), Burmese singer, songwriter, and actor
Paing Phyo Thu (born 1990), Burmese film actress and a medical doctor
Phyo Zeya Thaw (1981–2022), Burmese politician and hip-hop artist
Wai Phyo Aung (born 1985), Burmese politician and medical doctor
Heavy Phyo, Burmese child actor and singer
Hein Phyo Win (born 1998), Burmese footballer
Si Phyo (born 1990), Burmese actor
Htet Phyo Wai (born 2000), Burmese footballer
Phyo Ngwe Soe (born 1983), Burmese actor
Aung Wai Phyo (born 1993), Burmese footballer
Wai Phyo Aung (born 1985), Burmese politician and medical doctor
Phyo Phyo Ei (born 1991), Burmese television and film actress
Kyaw Zin Phyo (born 1993), Burmese footballer
Pyae Phyo Zaw (born 1994), Burmese footballer
Ani Phyo (born 1968), Canadian-born American chef, author, and whole food and sustainable agricultural advocate

Burmese-language surnames
Burmese-language given names
Surnames of Burmese origin